A sleep pod, also known as nap pod, napping pod, or nap capsule, is a special type of structure or chair that allows people to nap. Users use the pods to take private sleep breaks, often aided by technology and ambient features. Nap pods have emerged in corporate environments, hospitals, universities, airports and other public places. Their supposed efficacy is rooted in research that suggests that 20-minute naps could reduce signs of fatigue, boost energy levels, improve focus, boost productivity, improve mood, enhance learning, reduce stress and reduce the risk of cardiovascular disease.

Origins 
Technological development of nap pods emerges from growing awareness of the health benefits of sleep and napping including productivity and cognitive function. The original sleep pod was designed by Kisho Kurokawa in 1979, in his design for the Capsule Inn Osaka.

Existing designs

Rest Space 
The UK designed Rest Space aims to provide the user with 'the best space to rest', by creating 'the perfect environment' to wind down. 

It is inspired by the traditional Japanese capsule hotels with its fully enclosed space. The Rest Space has soundproofing, smart lights, inbuilt voice-controlled meditation and a purified airflow.

The design was built for comfort using sustainable woods.

MetroNaps EnergyPod 

The trademarked ‘pod chair’ is the world's first chair designed for napping in the workplace. The design is described as having a futuristic influence and features a 360-degree privacy shield as well as a leg rest that can be adjusted to ergonomically support the user’s body. The raised lower section elevates the feet, whilst leaving the knees slightly bent to relieve strain on the lower back and legs. This optimizes circulation and reduces pressure on the cardiac system, making it easier to relax. 

Users can press the start button to start a pre-programmed 20 minute nap. They can relax while listening to sleep music and are woken after 20 minutes by a combination of light and vibration. The design features a built-in BOSE speaker, but can also be used with own headphones.

The EnergyPod also allows for usage tracking, so that data can be collected by the licensee as to how regularly and at what times the device is utilised. The exterior of the pod also displays a ‘status indicator’ that reads when the pod will next be free.

The Sleep Box 
Designed by the arch group in 2009, Sleep Boxes are installed in airports and shopping centres. The designers state the products’ emphasis on providing ‘security and hygiene in urban infrastructure’. The pods can be rented by users in 30-minute blocks. The base mobile model is made of MDF, although custom designs are available in metal, glass and reinforced plastic variations. Bed boxes (2.5 m x 1.6 x 3m) can be constructed either individually or in sets of up to 3. Each pod has room for users to store their luggage and coats, as well as lay down. Ambience features include room lights, LED reading lights, electric blinds and air ventilation as well as electrical sockets for charging personal devices. Additional features such as TV screens, wifi access and coloured lighting are available for custom designs.

Napcabs 
A German-designed variation of the sleep box, which offers a small desk alongside a bed. These pods can be rented by the hour, and have a limit of 12 hours per user. They are specifically optimised for layovers between flights.

Nine Hours Narita 
Originating in Narita International Terminal, the nine hours nap pods form a tightly packed cell of capsules that guests can book for short naps as well as overnight stays. Each pod is 110 cm wide, 220 cm deep and 110 cm tall, fitted with a mattress like base. The capsules offer total visual privacy and can be locked from within. Users control asleep ambience system which includes light, sound and temperature preferences. Because of the small size of the containers, many travel guides warn that the nine-hour pods are not ideal for users with claustrophobia.

Podtime 
This pod is composed of a polycarbonate tube with frosted doors for privacy. Each is fitted with a custom mattress to the dimensions of the tube and has air circulation vents. Customisations to the design include different colours, leather-covered mattresses and digital radio. The pods can be dismantled and transported flat. This specific pod design became notable after being implemented in Facebook offices.

Workplace sleep culture 
Existing products and designs are being used particularly for professionals and commuters. By devising specialised furniture that encourages short, structured naps during the day, specialists like Dr James B Mass, who coined the term ‘power nap’, writes of his intention to alter existing workplace culture in the West to improve focus and energy. This aligns with cultural practices such as Siesta in Spain, a mid afternoon break where work and activity is halted. The Japanese practice of Inemuri, sleeping at work, is culturally viewed as proof of dedication to the point of exhaustion, and has also influenced the use of nap pods around the world.

Push for a workplace cultural shift that emphasises the necessity of sleep and rest has been heralded by Arianna Huffington. Her book The Sleep Revolution includes rhetoric that encourages normalisation for the need for rest in high stress work environments, and was followed by the launch of Thrive Global, an origination which provides wellness training to corporations including advice to encourage employees taking appropriate sleep breaks when needed. Huffington writes “That idea that sleep is somehow a sign of weakness and that burnout and sleep deprivation are macho signs of strength is particularly destructive, So changing the way we talk about sleep is an important part of the culture shift.”

Other leading scientists encouraging a revision of existing cultural understandings of exhaustion include Matthew Walker, neuroscientist and author of Why We Sleep: The New Science of Sleep and Dreams, who labeled humanity as in “the midst of a global sleep loss pandemic”. He has publicly endorsed nap pods in offices “even if they just signal some degree of recognition of sleep’s importance in the workplace by people in senior positions.”

Sleep specialist and psychiatrist Rita Aoud told The Guardian, in light of existing data that “Research shows that a nap of about 20 minutes in the afternoon has a positive effect on attention, vigilance, mood and alertness.

The actions of major corporations in establishing nap pod technology in their workplaces indicates that research and expert advice on the importance of sleep and the effectiveness of day time napping is influencing company culture.

Workplaces have been criticised for installing nap pods. Diana Bradley commented in one article that in offering technology such as these as perks for employees, companies can ignore more fundamental support in the form of management and policy.

References in science fiction 
Nap pods are a prevalent technology in science fiction books, movies and television, often fitted with futuristic sleep technology.

Cryosleep pods, which hold bodies frozen in suspended animation appear in the films Alien, Avatar, 2001: a Space Odyssey, Passengers and Event Horizon. In these instances compact bed ‘pods’ similar in construction to existing nap-pod designs are depicted, storing sleeping bodies during long term space travel.

The sleep pods in the 1979 film Alien are white capsules in clusters of eight, with glass shields across the top. The crew members inside are in suspended animation, unconscious until ‘activated’, un-aged and able to join the workforce. Suspended animation in pods is also seen in the space adventure TV series Lost in Space, Star Trek, and Futurama. In a 2015 Doctor Who episode, Sleep No More, the scientists and crew of a space lab forgo normal sleep patterns by using ‘Morpheus’ sleep pods, that can compress months of sleep into two minute nap. Confined within the pods, human’s brain activity is altered to maximise the productivity on board ship.

Notable locations 
Nap pod technology has been implemented and installed in a number of notable public and private spaces.

They are available at airports for travellers to use between and before flights at JFK airport, Berlin Airport, Munich Airport, Dubai Airport and Atlanta Airport.

Tech companies Google, Samsung and Facebook have both installed nap pods across their headquarters and offices for employee use. Nike's headquarters in Portland, Oregon has rooms on site in which employees can sleep or meditate. Ben & Jerry's has had a nap room at its headquarters since 2010.

Universities including King's College London, Sydney University, Western Sydney University, The University of Miami, Wesleyan University, Stanford University and Washington State University have nap pods in campus libraries and student centers.

The Sydney Swans AFL team installed two 'sleep chambers' for players to use between training and game sessions at the SCG Stadium.

In the UK, the NHS has installed sleep pods in public hospitals for doctors, nurses and staff.

References

Chairs
Sleep